PICS may refer to:
 Passive Inspection CubeSat, two nanosatellites launched in 2021
 Platform for Internet Content Selection, a content rating specification for websites
 Pacific Islands Central School/Pohnpei Island Central School, now Bailey Olter High School
 Post-intensive care syndrome
 Private investment capital subscription
 Protocol implementation conformance statement
 Punjab Institute of Computer Science
 Purdue Improved Crop Storage bags

Pics or pics, may refer to:
 Slang abbreviation of pictures
 .pics, a generic top-level domain name administered by Cayman Islands-based company Uniregistry

See also
PIC (disambiguation)